"Hide" is a song by American rock band Creed, released in 2002 as an International single from the band's third album, Weathered. It was imported as an extended play with two other songs: "Bullets" and "Unforgiven" (all album versions) along with the CGI-made video for "Bullets."

The band had released EPs and imports throughout the Eastern hemisphere. There was also a Spanish import with a gray background and their logo with the song name as cover art. The real EP artwork is of the Creed bandmates staring into the sun, with Stapp covering his face to see through the light.

Charts

References

http://www.artistdirect.com/nad/store/artist/album/0,,1694511,00.html
http://creedfeed.com/songs/hide/

Creed (band) songs
2002 songs
Songs written by Mark Tremonti
Songs written by Scott Stapp